Jabalpur has been one of the most important centers for higher education in the Madhya Pradesh region. This was true particularly in earlier years. In the 1950s and 1960s, the colleges were widely known in Madhya Pradesh and outside

Universities
 Jawaharlal Nehru Agricultural University, founded in 1964
 Madhya Pradesh Medical Science University, founded in 2011
 Nanaji Deshmukh Veterinary Science University, founded in 2009
 Rani Durgavati University, also known as the "University of Jabalpur" founded in 1956
 Dharmashastra National Law University, Jabalpur
 Mangalayatan University , Jabalpur

Engineering Colleges 
 Jabalpur Engineering College (JEC) founded in 1947

 Global Nature Care Sangathan Group of Institution Jabalpur (GNCSGI)
 Guru Ramdas Khalsa Institute of Science and Technology (GRKIST)
 Gyan Ganga College Of Technology (GGCT)
 Gyan Ganga Institute of Technology and Sciences (GGITS)
 Hitkarini College of Engineering and Technology (HCET)
 Indian Institute of Information Technology, Design and Manufacturing, Jabalpur 
 Lakshmi Narain College of Technology, Jabalpur (LNCT)
 Shri Ram Institute of Technology

Management Colleges
 Lakshmi Narain College of Technology, Jabalpur (LNCT)
 Xavier Institute of Development Action and Studies

Medical Colleges

 Netaji Subhash Chandra Bose Medical College
 Hitkarini Dental College & Hospital

Colleges
 Government Science College, Jabalpur (Erstwhile known as 'Robertson College' was established in 1836)
 St. Aloysius College, Jabalpur
 Govindram Seksaria College of Commerce
 Mata Gujri Mahila Mahavidyalaya
 Maharishi Mahesh Yogi Vedic Vishwavidyalaya

Schools

St. Aloysius Senior Secondary School, Established in 1868
St. Josephs' Convent Girls' Senior Secondary School
Christ Church Boys' Senior Secondary School
Christ Church Girls' Senior Secondary School
Vision International Public School, Patan Road
St. Gabriel's Senior Secondary School, Ranjhi
Little World School, Tilwara
Jawahar Navodaya Vidyalaya, Bargi Nagar
Joy Senior Secondary School, Jabalpur
 Delhi Public School, Nagpur Road
 Wisdom Valley School, Narmada Road 
 Nachiketa Higher Secondary School, Napier Town
 M.G.M. Higher Secondary School, Hatital

Training Institutes
Central Training Institute, Nayagaon 
Govt Model Industrial Training Institute, Damoh Road, Madhotaal
IGTR-ITI Hi-Tech Training Centre, Jabalpur founded in 2013

References

Jabalpur
Education in Jabalpur